Dennis "Denny" Chronopoulos (June 12, 1968 – August 27, 2000) was a Canadian football offensive guard who played four seasons in the Canadian Football League (CFL) with the Ottawa Rough Riders, BC Lions and Calgary Stampeders. He was drafted by the Ottawa Rough Riders with the third overall pick of the 1992 CFL Draft. He played college football at Purdue University.

Professional career
Chronopoulos was selected by the Ottawa Rough Riders of the CFL with the third pick in the 1992 CFL Draft. He played in all 36 games during his tenure with the Rough Riders and was named a CFL East All-Star in 1993. He was traded to the BC Lions in June 1994 with Andrew Stewart and Angelo Snipes for Kent Warnock and BC's second round pick in the 1995 CFL Draft. Chronopoulos signed with the CFL's Calgary Stampeders in March 1995. He was released by the Stampeders in 1996 after failing a physical due to a heart murmur.

Death
Chronopoulos died of a heart attack on August 27, 2000 in Montreal, Quebec.

References

External links
Just Sports Stats

1968 births
2000 deaths
American football offensive guards
Canadian football offensive linemen
Canadian players of American football
Purdue Boilermakers football players
Ottawa Rough Riders players
BC Lions players
Calgary Stampeders players
Players of Canadian football from Quebec
Canadian football people from Montreal